Heterogaster behrensii is a species of true bug in the family Heterogastridae. It is found in Central America and North America.

References

Lygaeoidea
Articles created by Qbugbot
Insects described in 1876